was the first Japanese woman to gain a pilot's licence.

Life 
Born in a village in Kita Uwa-gun, Ehime Prefecture (presently Kihoku, Ehime), Tadashi Hyōdō's abilities were recognized early and she moved from her local elementary school to the senior year at Seibi Girls' Higher School in Matsuyama, Ehime's capital city. Her father, Rintarō had hoped to be a pilot but instead made it his hobby to sketch airplane designs: after his death, she aimed to be a pilot, to fulfill her father's dream.
After graduating from high school, with her family wishing her to become either a medical practitioner or a teacher, she went to Osaka in January 1919 to become an apprentice  pharmacist.

Tsudanuma aviation school

With support from Kazoe, her elder sister, Tadashi was trained to fly at an aviation school in Tsudanuma managed by Otojirō Itō. Since a woman student at aviation school itself was so rare in those days, she was in newspapers when admitted to Itō's school, with articles read; "... a petite girl, round-faced and chubby, but a tomboy like a boy..." It is said that the tuition at those days cost "two yen per minute", when a new college graduate earned 40 yen per month in early 1910s. She worked time to time to earn enough for tuition, and it took her three and a half years to finish the course which trainees usually graduate in six months' time. She was the 15th trainee to finish the Tsudanuma aviation school and the first woman.

During her days at training, she attracted scandalous attention as to become a subject of a first page newspaper article and featured on air journals, but she was steadily working on to master maintenance as well as joining lectures among male trainees. She survived several accidents including a crash gliding from 3000 meters high in 1911 without serious injury but part of airplane's leg was damaged, or on other occasion, an emergency water landing.

It was in April 1921 when the Aviation Regulations  was promulgated in Japan, and after the pilot licensing system  was established, she was licensed a third-class airplane aviator (License no.38) on March 21, 1922 on her second challenge, and became the first woman aviator in Japan. The same year and soon after obtaining her aviation license, Hyōdō participated in the flight competition for the third-class aviators hosted by the Imperial Aeronautical Association  :ja:日本航空協会. She was the 10th out of 15 in the speed category.

Being the first woman pilot in Japan, she was exposed as scandalous figure out of curiosity and criticism that she was seeing a Mr. Tomita, a married lawyer from the same hometown, and with that false accusation, she was expelled from the Imperial Aeronautical Association. It also coincided with the Great Kanto Earthquake which made a huge impact on the society and industries, her figure disappeared from the aviation circle very abruptly, and never seen flying again. Tadashi Hyōdō planned to set up an aviation school of her own, and aimed for a lawyer later. She died at the age of 81 on April 23, 1980.

References

Bibliography

Japanese aviators
Women aviators
People from Ehime Prefecture
1899 births
1980 deaths
Japanese women aviators